Maria Sharapova defeated Serena Williams in the final, 4–6, 6–2, 6–4 to win the singles tennis title at the 2004 WTA Tour Championships. This was also the second and final time in which Sharapova defeated Williams, as she would lose their next 19 encounters.

Kim Clijsters was the two-time reigning champion, but did not qualify this year due to a long-term wrist injury.

Sharapova, Svetlana Kuznetsova and Vera Zvonareva made their debuts at the event.

Seeds 

Note: 
  Justine Henin-Hardenne had qualified but pulled out due to cytomegalovirus.

Alternates

Draw

Finals

Black Group 

Standings are determined by: 1. number of wins; 2. number of matches; 3. in two-players-ties, head-to-head records; 4. in three-players-ties, percentage of sets won, or of games won; 5. steering-committee decision.

Red Group 

Standings are determined by: 1. number of wins; 2. number of matches; 3. in two-players-ties, head-to-head records; 4. in three-players-ties, percentage of sets won, or of games won; 5. steering-committee decision.

References

See also
WTA Tour Championships appearances

Singles 2004
2004 WTA Tour